Śmigiel  is a town in Poland.

Śmigiel  or Smigiel  may also refer to:
Gmina Śmigiel, a gmina in Poland, with the seat at Śmigiel
Śmigiel (surname)

See also
 
 Schmiegel (disambiguation)
 Smigel